The Nishinomiya Storks (西宮ストークス) are a professional basketball team based in Nishinomiya, Hyogo Prefecture, Japan that competes in the Japanese B.League 2.

History
The club was formed in 2011 as the Hyogo Storks (兵庫ストークス） and entered the second division of the Japan Basketball League (JBL2) in the 2011-12 season, finishing with a record of 17 wins and 10 losses. The club was JBL2 league champions in the 2012-13 season with a record of 27 wins and 5 losses, which was the final season of the league before it was reformed as the National Basketball Development League.
The club’s success in the 2012-13 season earned it promotion to the first division of the JBL, which was reformed as the NBL for the 2013-2014 season.

On 16 July 2015 the Storks announced an agreement with the City of Nishinomiya that will see the team based in the city and the name changed to the Nishinomiya Storks.
The decision is also one move aimed at the club securing a position in the new Japan Professional Basketball League that will commence in the autumn of 2016.

Home arena
During the 2013–14 and 2014-15 seasons, the Hyogo Storks played approximately half of their home games at the Kobe Central Gymnasium in the Chuo Ward of Kobe. As the team was officially based within Hyogo Prefecture (and not Kobe city), it played home games at various towns within the prefecture.

For the 2015-2016 season, the Nishinomiya Storks will play about 40% (around ten) and since 2016-2017 season, around two-thirds of their home games at the Nishinomiya City Central Gymnasium.

Nishinomiya City Central Gymnasium
Kobe Tokiwa Arena
Wink Gymnasium
Kakogawa Municipal General Gymnasium
Komagatani Sports Park Gymnasium
Takarazuka City General Gymnasium
Sumoto City Cultural Gymnasium
Kamigori Sports Center

Coaches
BT Toews
Danny Yoshikawa
Yasunori Ueda
Kensaku Tennichi
Miodrag Rajković
Mathias Fischer

Roster

Notable players
Draelon Burns
Isaac Butts
Seaun Eddy
Davante Gardner
Herbert Hill
Billy Knight
Cheikh Mbodj
Yuto Otsuka
Larry Owens
Dillion Sneed
Akitomo Takeno
Jordan Vandenberg
Brad Waldow
DeVaughn Washington

References

External links
 Official homepage

 
Basketball teams in Japan
Basketball teams established in 2011
2011 establishments in Japan
Sports teams in Hyōgo Prefecture
Nishinomiya